HD 69830 d is an exoplanet likely orbiting within the habitable zone of the star HD 69830, the outermost of three such planets discovered in the system. It is located approximately 40.7 light-years (12.49 parsecs, or  km) from Earth in the constellation of Puppis. The exoplanet was found by using the radial velocity method, from radial-velocity measurements via observation of Doppler shifts in the spectrum of the planet's parent star.

Characteristics

Mass, radius and temperature
HD 69830 d is an ice giant, with a mass and radius near that of the planets Uranus and Neptune, but smaller than that of the gas giants Jupiter and Saturn. The radius is not known, however given its mass of 17 , which is around that of the planet Neptune, it likely has a radius of around 4 . In other terms, it is basically a warmer version of Neptune.

Host star 
The planet orbits a (G-type) star named HD 69830, orbited by total of three planets, of which HD 69830 d has the longest orbital period. The star has a mass of 0.86  and a radius of 0.90 . It has a surface temperature of 5394 K and is 10.6 billion years old. In comparison, the Sun is 4.6 billion years old and has a surface temperature of 5778 K.

The star's apparent magnitude, or how bright it appears from Earth's perspective, is 5.47. Therefore, HD 69830 is visible to the naked eye.

Orbit
The planet's orbit has a low orbital eccentricity, like most of the planets in the Solar System. The semimajor axis of the orbit is only 0.63 AU, similar to that of Venus. However, its star is less massive and energetic than the Sun (with a luminosity of 0.62 ), thereby putting the planet within its habitable zone.

Habitability 

HD 69830 d likely resides in the habitable zone of its parent star. The exoplanet, with an estimated mass of 17 , is too massive to likely be rocky, and because of this the planet itself is not habitable. Hypothetically, large enough moons, with a sufficient atmosphere and pressure, may be able to support liquid water and potentially life.

For a stable orbit the ratio between the moon's orbital period Ps around its primary and that of the primary around its star Pp must be < 1/9, e.g. if a planet takes 90 days to orbit its star, the maximum stable orbit for a moon of that planet is less than 10 days. Simulations suggest that a moon with an orbital period less than about 45 to 60 days will remain safely bound to a massive giant planet or brown dwarf that orbits 1 AU from a Sun-like star. In the case of HD 69830 d, this would be around 22 days in order to have a stable orbit.

Tidal effects could also allow the moon to sustain plate tectonics, which would cause volcanic activity to regulate the moon's temperature and create a geodynamo effect which would give the satellite a strong magnetic field.

To support an Earth-like atmosphere for about 4.6 billion years (the age of the Earth), the moon would have to have a Mars-like density and at least a mass of 0.07 . One way to decrease loss from sputtering is for the moon to have a strong magnetic field that can deflect stellar wind and radiation belts. NASA's Galileo's measurements hints large moons can have magnetic fields; it found that Jupiter's moon Ganymede has its own magnetosphere, even though its mass is only 0.025 .

Discovery
HD 69830 d was discovered in 2006 with the HARPS echelle spectrograph installed on the European Southern Observatory 3.6-meter telescope at La Silla Observatory, Chile.

In popular culture
In the Halo video game series, a moon of HD 69830 d is the homeworld of the Kig-Yar ("Jackal") species, a member species of the enemy, the Covenant Empire.

See also
 Sudarsky exoplanet classification

References

External links
SST: Signs of Alien Asteroid Belt 
SolStation: HD 69830 / HR 3259
SPACE.com: Planets Found in Potentially Habitable Setup (May 17, 2006)
SpaceDaily:  Trio Of Neptunes And Their Belt (May 18, 2006)

HD 69830
Exoplanets discovered in 2006
Exoplanets detected by radial velocity
Giant planets in the habitable zone
Ice giants